The Mirchi Music Award for Album of The Year is given yearly by Radio Mirchi as a part of its annual Mirchi Music Awards for Hindi films, to recognise the Best song of that year.

List of winners
 2008 "Jaane Tu... Ya Jaane Na" - A.R Rahman, Abbas Tyrewala
 "Dostana" - Vishal–Shekhar, Anvita Dutt Guptan, Kumaar, Vishal Dadlani
 "Ghajini" - A.R Rahman, Prasoon Joshi
 "Jodha Akbar" - A.R Rahman, Javed Akhtar
 "Rock On!!" - Shankar–Ehsaan–Loy, Javed Akhtar
 2009 "Delhi-6" - A.R Rahman, Prasoon Joshi
 "Kaminey" - Vishal Bhardwaj, Gulzar
 "Love Aaj Kal" - Pritam, Irshad Kamil
 "Slumdog Millionaire" - A.R Rahman, Gulzar, Raquib Alam
 "Ajab Prem Ki Ghazab Kahani" - Pritam, Irshad Kamil, Ashish Pandit
 2010 "Dabangg" - Sajid–Wajid, Lalit Pandit, Faiz Anwar, Jalees Sherwani
 "My Name is Khan" - Shankar–Ehsaan–Loy, Niranjan Iyengar
 "Ishqiya" - Vishal Bhardwaj, Gulzar
 "Once Upon A Time In Mumbaai" - Pritam, Irshad Kamil, Neelesh Misra, Amitabh Bhattacharya
 Break Ke Baad - Vishal–Shekhar, Prasoon Joshi
 2011 "Rockstar" - A.R Rahman, Irshad Kamil
 "Zindagi Na Milegi Dobara" - Shankar–Ehsaan–Loy, Javed Akhtar
 "Ra.One" - Vishal–Shekhar, Atahar Panchi, Vishal Dadlani, Kumaar
 "The Dirty Picture" - Vishal–Shekhar, Rajat Arora
 "Bodyguard" - Himesh Reshammiya, Pritam,  Neelesh Misra, Shabbir Ahmed
 2012 "Agneepath" - Ajay–Atul, Amitabh Bhattacharya
 "Barfi!" - Pritam, Ashish Pandit, Sayeed Quadri, Swanand Kirkire, Neelesh Misra, Amitabh Bhattacharya
 "Cocktail" - Pritam, Irshad Kamil, Amitabh Bhattacharya
 "Ishaqzaade" - Amit Trivedi, Kausar Munir
 "Student of the Year" - Vishal–Shekhar, Anvita Dutt Guptan
 2013 "Aashiqui 2" - Mithoon, Jeet Gannguli, Ankit Tiwari, Sandeep Nath, Irshad Kamil, Sanjay Masoomm
 "Yeh Jawaani Hai Deewani" - Pritam, Amitabh Bhattacharya
 "Bhaag Milkha Bhaag" - Shankar–Ehsaan–Loy, Javed Akhtar
 "Ram-Leela" - Sanjay Leela Bhansali, Siddharth–Garima
 "Raanjhanaa" - A.R Rahman, Irshad Kamil
 2014 "2 States" - Shankar–Ehsaan–Loy, Amitabh Bhattacharya
 "Queen" - Amit Trivedi, Anvita, Verma Malik, Raghu Nath
 "Gunday" - Sohail Sen, Irshad Kamil, Ali Abbas Zafar, Bappi Lahiri, Gautam Susmit
 "Ek Villain" - Mithoon, Ankit Tiwari, Rabbi Ahmad, Adnaan Dhool, Manoj Muntashir, Rabbi Ahmad, Adnan Dhool
 "CityLights" - Jeet Gannguli, Rashmi Singh
 2015 Bajirao Mastani" - Sanjay Leela Bhansali, Siddharth–Garima, A. M. Turaz, Nasir Faraaz, Prashant Ingole
 "Roy" - Amaal Mallik, Ankit Tiwari, Meet Bros Anjjan, Kumaar, Abhendra Kumar Upadhyay, Sandeep Nath
 "Dil Dhadakne Do" - Shankar–Ehsaan–Loy, Javed Akhtar
 "Badlapur" - Sachin–Jigar, Dinesh Vijan, Priya Saraiya
 "ABCD 2" - Sachin–Jigar, Mayur Puri, Priya Saraiya
 2016 Ae Dil Hai Mushkil" - Pritam, Amitabh Bhattacharya
 "Dangal" - Pritam, Amitabh Bhattacharya
 "Udta Punjab" - Amit Trivedi, Shiv Kumar Batalvi, Shellee, Varun Grover
 "Sultan" - Vishal–Shekhar, Irshad Kamil
 "Kapoor & Sons" - Amaal Mallik, Arko Pravo Mukherjee, Nucleya, Tanishk Bagchi
 2017 "Jab Harry Met Sejal" - Pritam, Irshad Kamil
 "Tiger Zinda Hai" - Vishal–Shekhar, Irshad Kamil
 "Secret Superstar" - Amit Trivedi, Kausar Munir
 "Raabta" - Pritam, JAM8, Irshad Kamil, Amitabh Bhattacharya, Kumaar
 "Jagga Jasoos" - Pritam, Amitabh Bhattacharya, Neelesh Misra
 2018 "Padmaavat" - Sanjay Leela Bhansali, A. M. Turaz, Siddharth-Garima, Swaroop Khan
 "Sonu Ke Titu Ki Sweety" - Amaal Mallik, Guru Randhawa , Rajat Nagpal, Rochak Kohli, Saurabh-Vaibhav, Yo Yo Honey Singh, Kumaar, Swapnil Tiwari
 "Raazi" - Shankar–Ehsaan–Loy, Gulzar, Allama Iqbal
 "Manmarziyaan" - Amit Trivedi, Shellee & Sikander Kahlon
 "Kedarnath" - Amit Trivedi, Amitabh Bhattacharya
 2019  "Kesari" - Arko Pravo Mukherjee, Chirrantan Bhatt, Gurmoh, Jasbir Jassi, Jasleen Royal, Tanishk Bagchi, Kumaar, Kunwar Juneja, Manoj Muntashir
 "Bharat" - Vishal–Shekhar, Ali Abbas Zafar, Julius Packiam, Irshad Kamil
 "Gully Boy" - Ankur Tewari, Divine, Dub Sharma, Ishq Bector, Jasleen Royal, Ace aka Mumbai, Chandrashekar Kunder (Major C), Hardeep, Kaam Bhaari, Karsh Kale, Midival Punditz, Mikey McCleary, Naezy, Prem, Sez on the Beat, Raghu Dixit, Rishi Rich, Spitfire & Viveick Rajagopalan, Javed Akhtar, 100 RBH, Aditya Sharma, Arjun, Bhinder Khanpuri, Blitz, Desi Ma, Gaurav Raina, Maharya, MC Altaf, MC TodFod, MC Mawali, Noxious D, Tapan Raj, D-Cypher, BeatRaw
 "Kabir Singh" - Akhil Sachdeva, Amaal Mallik, Mithoon, Sachet–Parampara & Vishal Mishra, Irshad Kamil, Kumaar, Manoj Muntashir
 "Kalank" - Pritam, Amitabh Bhattacharya

See also
 Mirchi Music Awards
 Bollywood
 Cinema of India

References

Mirchi Music Awards
Album awards